Una McLean MBE (born 12 January 1930 in Strathaven, Scotland) is a Scottish actress and comedian. She is best known for appearing in pantomimes. She was married to Scottish stage and film actor Russell Hunter from 1991 until his death in 2004.

She trained at the Royal Scottish Academy of Music and Drama and began her career at the Byre Theatre in St Andrews in 1955. She joined the Citizens' Theatre in Glasgow in 1959.  From 1965 she starred in her own show for Scottish Television, Over to Una, and In 1967 she starred in Scotland's first one-woman television show, Did you see Una? She has appeared in several films, including Peter Capaldi's Strictly Sinatra in 2001.

She has appeared in many pantomimes in Scotland, often starring opposite Jimmy Logan and with Stanley Baxter. She starred in Jack and the Beanstalk alongside Jimmy Logan in his last pantomime appearance at King's Theatre, Glasgow as Wondergran, a show that also featured Alyson McInnes, John Ramage, and Euan McIver.

She was awarded the MBE in 2006. She appeared in 2007 on television in the sitcom Still Game. In 2009 she began playing the role of Molly O'Hara in the BBC One Scotland soap opera River City. In May 2019, she announced her retirement from the show.

Radio

References

External links 

Scottish women comedians
Scottish film actresses
Scottish radio actresses
Scottish stage actresses
Scottish television actresses
1930 births
Living people
Members of the Order of the British Empire
People from Strathaven
Scottish soap opera actresses
Alumni of the Royal Conservatoire of Scotland